

List of Forests in the Eastern Cape, South Africa

 Amatole Forest
 Dwesa
 Tsitsikamma Forest

See also

 KwaZulu-Cape coastal forest mosaic

Geography of the Eastern Cape
Eastern Cape
Forests